is a unisex Japanese given name. It may refer to:

Female
Mikoto Urabe, a character in the  anime "Nazo no Kanojo X"
Mikoto Minagi, a character in the anime My-HiME
Mikoto Suo, a character in the manga and anime School Rumble
Mikoto, a character in the game Samurai Showdown
Mikoto, a villain in the anime/manga Flame of Recca
Mikoto Misaka, a character in the anime Toaru Majutsu no Index
Mikoto, the Genome pseudo-sister to Zidane Tribal in Final Fantasy IX.
Mikoto Uchiha, mother to Sasuke Uchiha and Itachi Uchiha, a character in the popular manga/anime series Naruto
Miko, a character in Demon Love Spell  
Mikoto, a character in the video game "Rune Factory: Tides of Destiny"
Mikoto, the Queen of Hoshido, a character in Fire Emblem Fates
Yamato Mikoto, a character in Is It Wrong to Try to Pick Up Girls in a Dungeon?
Undefined
MEIKA Mikoto, a character representing a voicebank of the same name for the vocal synthesizer VOCALOID5
Male
Mikoto Nakadai/AbareKiller, an anti-hero from Bakuryuu Sentai Abaranger
Mikoto Usui, Japanese-born American development economist and scholar.
Mikoto Suoh, a character in the anime K
Mikoto Sayama, a character in the light novel The Ending Chronicle
Mikoto Inugami from Inu x Boku SS
Mikoto Suno from Eyeshield 21
Kayano Mikoto is one of the prisoners in MILGRAM anime version

See also
Wakamikenu no Mikoto

Japanese unisex given names